John Millington (birth registered first ¼ 1949) is an English former professional rugby league footballer who played in the 1970s and 1980s.

Background
John Millington's birth was registered in Hull district, East Riding of Yorkshire, England.

Playing career

International honours
John Millington won caps for England while at Hull Kingston Rovers in 1975 against France, and in 1981 against Wales.

County Honours

John Millington represented Yorkshire in games against Lancashire in 1974, 1975 & 1981.

Challenge Cup Final appearances
John Millington was an interchange/substitute, i.e. number 15, in Hull Kingston Rovers' 10–5 victory over Hull F.C. in the 1979–80 Challenge Cup Final during the 1979–80 season at Wembley Stadium, London on Saturday 3 May 1980, in front of a crowd of 95,000, and was an interchange/substitute, i.e. number 15, in the 9–18 defeat by Widnes in the 1980–81 Challenge Cup Final during the 1980–81 season at Wembley Stadium, London on Saturday 2 May 1981, in front of a crowd of 92,496.

County Cup Final appearances
John Millington played right-, i.e. number 10, in Hull Kingston Rovers' 11–7 victory over Castleford in the 1971–72 Yorkshire County Cup Final during the 1971–72 season at Belle Vue, Wakefield on Saturday 21 August 1971, played left-, i.e. number 8, in the 16–13 victory over Wakefield Trinity in the 1974–75 Yorkshire County Cup Final during the 1974–75 season at Headingley Rugby Stadium, Leeds on Saturday 26 October 1974, and played left- in the 11–15 defeat by Leeds in the 1975–76 Yorkshire County Cup Final during the 1975–76 season at Headingley Rugby Stadium, Leeds on Saturday 15 November 1975.

BBC2 Floodlit Trophy Final appearances
John Millington played left-, i.e. number 8, in Hull Kingston Rovers' 26–11 victory over St. Helens in the 1977 BBC2 Floodlit Trophy Final during the 1977–78 season at Craven Park, Hull on Tuesday 13 December 1977.

John Player Trophy Final appearances
John Millington played as an interchange/substitute, i.e. number 15, (replacing  Roy Holdstock) in Hull Kingston Rovers' 4–12 defeat by Hull F.C. in the 1981–82 John Player Trophy Final during the 1981–82 season at Headingley Rugby Stadium, Leeds on Saturday 23 January 1982.

Club honours
Championship: 1978–79, 1983–84, 1984–85. Challenge Cup: 1979–80. Yorkshire County Cup: 1971–72, 1974–75. BBC2 Floodlit Trophy: 1977–78. John Player Special Trophy: 1984–85. Premiership: 1980–81, 1983–84.

Testimonial match
A benefit season/testimonial match for Steve Hartley and John Millington took place at Hull Kingston Rovers during the 1981–82 season, it raised £25,000 (based on increases in average earnings, this would be approximately £120,400 in 2018).

References

External links
Photograph of John Millington
Photograph of John Millington (Left)
(archived by web.archive.org) Photograph of John Millington

1949 births
Living people
England national rugby league team players
English rugby league players
Hull Kingston Rovers players
Rugby league players from Kingston upon Hull
Rugby league props
Wakefield Trinity players